Double or Nothing (1940) is a short comedy film released by Warner Brothers, directed by Roy Mack, and starring Lee Dixon along with the real-life "doubles" of famous Hollywood actors. Actor Tom Herbert appears as the double for his brother, comedian Hugh Herbert.

Plot
The film's plot is similar to the Warners release Double or Nothing (1936), where an actor (Dixon) gets knocked out and dreams of actors "doubled" by their actual stand-ins.

External links

1940 films
Warner Bros. films
1940 comedy films
1940 short films
American comedy short films
Films directed by Roy Mack
American black-and-white films
1940s American films